Guillermo Ernesto Eleazar Cuerva, or simply known as Gil Cuerva, (born on August 21, 1995), is a Spanish Filipino actor and international model. Cuerva debuted as an actor on the tele-drama remake of the hit South Korean romantic-comedy-scifi series, My Love from the Star, as one of the leading characters with GMA Network's Ultimate Star Jennylyn Mercado that briefly aired on GMA Network.

Career
Cuerva is a Filipino model of Spanish descent from his father's side. He was started from Vaseline Dandruff Care Commercial which the late German Moreno was in cameo. After modelling in Hong Kong for a couple of months, he went back to the Philippines and auditioned for the Philippine adaptation of the Korean science-fiction My Love from the Star which also stars Jennylyn Mercado, Christian Bautista and Jackie Rice.

Filmography

Television

Drama and comedy

Reality, variety and talk shows

Accolades

References

External links

1995 births
Living people
Filipino expatriates in Hong Kong
Filipino male models
Filipino people of Spanish descent
GMA Network personalities
Tagalog people
Male actors from Manila